The United States of America vs. Alfried Krupp, et al., commonly known as the Krupp trial, was the tenth of twelve trials for war crimes that U.S. authorities held in their occupation zone at Nuremberg, Germany after the end of World War II. It concerned the forced labor enterprises of the Krupp concern and other crimes committed by the concern.

These twelve trials were all held before U.S. military courts, not before the International Military Tribunal, but took place in the same rooms at the Palace of Justice. The twelve U.S. trials are collectively known as the "subsequent Nuremberg Trials" or, more formally, as the "Trials of War Criminals before the Nuremberg Military Tribunals" (NMT). The Krupp Trial was the third of three trials of German industrialists; the other two were the Flick Trial and the IG Farben Trial.

The case
In the Krupp Trial, twelve former directors of the Krupp Group were accused of having enabled the armament of the German military forces and thus having actively participated in the Nazis' preparations for an aggressive war, and also for having used slave laborers in their companies. The main defendant was Alfried Krupp von Bohlen und Halbach, CEO of the Krupp Holding since 1943 and son of Gustav Krupp von Bohlen und Halbach who had been a defendant in the main Trial of the Major War Criminals before the IMT (where he was considered medically unfit for trial).

The judges in this case, heard before Military Tribunal III-A, were Hu C. Anderson (presiding judge), president of the court of appeals of Tennessee, Edward J. Daly from Connecticut, and William J. Wilkins from Seattle, Washington. The Chief of Counsel for the Prosecution was Telford Taylor; the Chief Trial Counsel was H. Russell Thayer, and Benjamin B. Ferencz participated as a Special Counsel. The indictment was presented on November 17, 1947; the trial lasted from December 8, 1947 until July 31, 1948. One defendant (Pfirsch) was acquitted, the others received prison sentences between three and twelve years, and the main defendant Alfried Krupp was ordered to sell all his possessions.

The main defendant Alfried Krupp always denied any guilt. In 1947, he stated:

Indeed, the Krupp holding did flourish under the Nazi regime. According to conservative estimates, the Krupp enterprises used nearly 100,000 persons in the slave labour programme, about 23,000 of which were prisoners of war.

Indictment 
 Crimes against peace by participating in the planning and waging of wars of aggression and wars in violation of international treaties;
 Crimes against humanity by participating in the plundering, devastation, and exploitation of occupied countries;
 Crimes against humanity by participating in the murder, extermination, enslavement, deportation, imprisonment, torture, and use for slave labor of civilians who came under German control, German nationals, and prisoners of war;
 Participating in a common plan or conspiracy to commit crimes against peace.

All defendants were charged under counts 1, 3, and 4; count 2 excluded the defendants Lehmann and Kupke. Counts 1 and 4 were soon dropped due to lack of evidence.

Defendants 

All eleven defendants found guilty were convicted on the forced labor charge (count 3), and of the ten charged on count 2 (economic spoliation), six were convicted. On January 31, 1951, two and a half years after the sentences, ten (all except Löser) were released from prison. Since no buyer for the Krupp Holding had been found, Alfried Krupp resumed control of the firm in 1953.

See also
 Flick Trial

References 
Trial proceedings (partial).
Description of the trial from the U.S. Holocaust Memorial Museum.
Transcript of a German radio broadcast from 1999 on the Krupp trial and the IG Farben Trial (in German, with English quotations).

United States Nuremberg Military Tribunals
1947 in Germany
1948 in Germany